"More Than I Know" is the second single released under the Leftfield name. Paul Daley was not involved in the song's creation; however, the B-side was a remix of "Not Forgotten" by Daley requested by Neil Barnes. The song was written by Barnes and released only on 12" on 21 January 1991 on the Outer Rhythm record label, published by Rhythm King Music.

Track listing

12"
 "More Than I Know"
 "Not Forgotten" (Hard Hands Remix)

Remix 12"
 "More Than I Know" (10K Mix)
 "More Than I Know" (More Mix)
 "More Than I Know" (Even More Mix)

1991 singles
Leftfield songs